Fresh Fest Beer Fest is a beer festival held annually in Pittsburgh, Pennsylvania since 2018. Geared towards increasing diversity in the craft beer industry, Fresh Fest is the nation's first festival for Black-owned breweries.

Origins
Fresh Fest was conceived by podcast hosts Day Bracey and Ed Bailey of the Drinking Partners Podcast, and entrepreneur Mike Potter of Black Brew Culture. Citing a lack of diversity in craft beer brewers and consumers, the creators sought both to bring together Black-owned breweries and provide and inclusive space to connect beer drinkers. In addition to Black-owned breweries nationwide, Fresh Fest also showcases Pittsburgh-area breweries through partnerships with local Black businesses, entrepreneurs, politicians, and other personalities.

Location
The 2018 and 2019 Fresh Fests were held at Nova Place on Pittsburgh's North Shore. Since 2021, Fresh Fest's a block party in Pittsburgh's Allentown neighbourhood. The COVID-19 pandemic caused 2020's cancellation of most events, and some had gone virtual.

See also
Craft beer
List of breweries in Pennsylvania
List of festivals in Pennsylvania

References

African-American festivals
Festivals in Pennsylvania
Festivals in Pittsburgh
Beer festivals in the United States
Beer festivals